Formula Junior is an open wheel formula racing class first adopted in October 1958 by the CSI (International Sporting Commission, the part of the FIA that then regulated motorsports). The class was intended to provide an entry level class where drivers could use inexpensive mechanical components from ordinary automobiles. The idea to form the new class came from Count Giovanni "Johnny" Lurani who saw the need of a class for single-seater racing cars where younger drivers could take their first steps. It is often speculated that this class was founded as a reaction to Italy's lack of success in the 500cc Formula Three, and although Italian marques dominated the first year of the formula, they were soon overtaken by British constructors.

History
Parts like engine block, head and cylinders had to come from a production car; single or twin overhead camshafts, limited slip differentials and modifications to the number of main bearings were all forbidden. The brakes and transmission also had to be production-based. Constructors were allowed to increase the number of gears, but only  inside a production gearbox casing.

In Italy the popular Fiat 1100 engine was the obvious choice and in 1958 there were few other suitable engines in Italy; elsewhere the 1000 cc Mini engine as well as the DKW and the Saab three-cylinder two-stroke engines were obvious choices, as was the new oversquare Ford engine from the 105E Anglia. The first Italian FJ cars were very much in the front-engined tradition of contemporary Grand Prix cars; the first international Formula Junior championship in 1959 was won by the Swiss driver and engineer Michael May in an Automobili Stanguellini. The British constructors were initially not particularly interested; the 500cc Formula Three was still just about viable, and small-capacity sports car racing had become the accepted route into racing. As the formula gathered momentum, though, constructors started to take note.

In the UK, Frank Nichols of Elva produced the Elva 100 series powered by a BMC A-Series (Sprite or Mini) engine or a DKW two-stroke engine tuned by Gerhard Mitter in Germany. The Elva became first mass-produced British Formula Junior car. Other early British designs included the Gemini (earlier called Moorland) and Lola Mk 2.

Although these early British FJs were front-engined, the F1 car was undergoing a mid-engined revolution and there were also strands of thinking in FJ that stemmed from the 500cc Formula Three where rear-engined cars had been the norm. It was not long before Cooper started to produce a car similar to their contemporary F1/F2 thinking, later F3s and "bobtail" sports car fitted with BMC A-series engines. On the engine side, Keith Duckworth of Cosworth Engineering took an interest in Formula Junior and managed to get hold of two of the new engines to be used in the 1959 Ford Anglia. Lotus also came into the game with their Lotus 18, a simplified derivative of their Formula One and Formula Two chassis fitted with a  Ford Anglia engine. Later Lotus also raced in Formula Junior with Lotus 20, Lotus 22 and Lotus 27. These two marques (Cooper and Lotus), with close links to their Grand Prix teams, soon came to dominate Formula Junior on an international level.

In Sweden, Saab produced the Saab Formula Junior, mainly to test new engine designs.

In Russia the most used engine came from the Moskvitch.

Through the formula's lifetime, though, the number of manufacturers increased. By the end of 1960 there were over 100 manufacturers worldwide, and by the end of 1963 the number had increased to almost 500 – but the vast majority of race wins went to the British constructors of mid-engined cars. Brabham's first racing car was the mid-engined BT1 (originally called the MRD, but renamed when it was realised that the initials had unfortunate connotations in French) in 1961. By 1963 the class had become expensive, the scope for wins in homebuilt or amateur cars was diminishing and the cost of tuning a 1000 cc engine to get up to 120 hp was getting too high. The 1963 series was the last series in the UK and Europe.

In the early 1960s, after Formula One was reduced to a 1.5l engine capacity and Formula Two disappeared, Formula Junior suffered from playing two roles, both an introduction to single-seater racing for novices, and the only international single seater category below F1. The latter role meant that costs were pushed up too high for many amateurs (competing against works or near-works Coopers and Lotuses meant that there was little chance of success in major races), and it was decided that two new formulae were needed to replace FJ; one-litre Formula Two and Formula Three were reintroduced for 1964, with F2 allowing pure-bred race engines and aimed very much at professional and serious up-and-coming drivers, and F3 essentially being a slightly tamer version of FJ for amateurs and those at an earlier stage in their career.

Slightly later in the 1960s, classes based on the same original idea as FJ evolved as low-cost introductions to single-seater motor racing, notably Formula Ford and Formula Vee.

Because many cars and engines are still readily available, Formula Junior is now a popular category in historic racing.

Drivers with a background in Formula Junior include: Jim Clark, Peter Arundell, Trevor Taylor, John Surtees (whose association with the formula was very brief), Denny Hulme, Ed Leslie, Pat Pigott and Jack McAfee. German Gerhard Mitter successfully raced (40 wins) and sold (130) two-stroke-engines for FJ.

See also
Messina Grand Prix
Australian Formula Junior Championship

References

External links 

 Formula Junior Historic Racing Association
Formula Junior Historics North America

 
Junior
Motorsport categories in Australia